The Peć–Mitrovica road (Пећ—Митровица) or Mitrovica–Peć road (Митровица—Пећ) was a road of Serbia in the Middle Ages, an extension of the Ibar road. It was used exclusively for caravans. It was reconstructed by the Ottoman authorities prior to the Balkan Wars but due to insecurity it was abandoned. The Serbian government continued the reconstruction mostly after 1919 and in 1925 it became part of the 650 km long Belgrade–Kotor (or "Adriatic") road. It was further reconstructed in 1928.

References

Sources

Medieval Serbia
Economy of Serbia in the Middle Ages
Former trade routes
Roads in Serbia
Roads in Kosovo
Peja
Mitrovica, Kosovo
Medieval roads and tracks